"Nature's Law" is a song by English rock band Embrace from their fifth studio album, This New Day (2006). It was released 20 March 2006 as the lead single from the album, peaking at number two on the UK Singles Chart, the band's highest chart entry to date.

Track listings
UK CD single 
 "Nature's Law" – 4:09
 "Deliver Me" – 3:52
 "Collide" – 2:57

UK DVD single 
 "Nature's Law" (audio)
 "Nature's Law" (video)
 "Nature's Law" (video—live at the M.E.N. Arena)
 "Nature's Law" (video—behind the scenes)

UK limited-edition 7-inch orange vinyl single 
A. "Nature's Law" – 4:09
B. "Soulmates" – 4:11

UK digital download
 "Nature's Law" – 4:07
 "Deliver Me" – 3:54
 "Collide" – 2:59
 "Nature's Law" (draft one) – 4:15
 "Nature's Law" (live at Alexandra Palace) – 4:10
 "Nature's Law" (live at the M.E.N. Arena) – 4:12
 "Nature's Law" (orchestral instrumental version) – 4:06
 "Nature's Law" (orchestral version) – 4:11

Charts

Weekly charts

Year-end charts

References

Embrace (English band) songs
2006 singles
2006 songs
Independiente (record label) singles
Number-one singles in Scotland
Songs written by Danny McNamara
Songs written by Youth (musician)
Songs written by Richard McNamara
UK Independent Singles Chart number-one singles